Parectopa ononidis is a moth of the family Gracillariidae. It is known from all of Europe, except Ireland and the Balkan Peninsula.

The wingspan is about 8 mm. Adults are on wing from May to August in two to three generations per year.

The larvae feed on Ononis repens, Ononis spinosa, Trifolium medium, Trifolium montanum, Trifolium ochroleucon, Trifolium pratense and Trifolium repens. They mine the leaves of their host plant. The mine starts as a small, lower-surface epidermal corridor. Only after the first moult the larva starts feeding on the leaf parenchyma, resulting in a corridor overlying the midrib. From here branches enter the leaf disk, gradually widening and merging, leaving almost the entire mine mined out in the end. Most frass is ejected. The larva may leave the mine and start elsewhere. Pupation takes place within the mine.

References

Gracillariinae
Moths of Europe